The 2008–09 Championnat National was the 16th edition of the 3rd division league. Play commenced on 1 August 2008 and ended on 29 May 2009. Vannes OC, Tours FC, and Nîmes Olympique were promoted to Ligue 2, replacing Chamois Niortais, FC Libourne-Saint-Seurin, and FC Gueugnon who were relegated from Ligue 2.

Villemomble Sports, Pau FC, FC Martigues and SO Romorantin were relegated to the CFA, and promoted from the CFA were Pacy Vallée-d'Eure from Group A, Croix de Savoie Gaillard from Group B, SO Cassis Carnoux from Group C, and Aviron Bayonnais FC from Group D.

Participating teams
As usual, there will be 20 teams competing in the Championnat National in the 2008–09 season.

 AC Arles
 Aviron Bayonnais FC
 AS Beauvais Oise
 AS Cannes
 Calais RUFC
 SO Cassis Carnoux
 AS Cherbourg Football
 US Créteil-Lusitanos
 Croix de Savoie Gaillard
 FC Gueugnon
 FC Istres
 Stade Lavallois
 FC Libourne-Saint-Seurin
 CS Louhans-Cuiseaux
 Chamois Niortais
 Pacy Vallée-d'Eure
 Paris FC
 Rodez AF
 L'Entente SSG
 FC Sète

League table

Stats

Top goalscorers

Last updated: 30 May 2009
Source: FootNational

Managers

External links
Championnat National Official Site
Championnat National Standings
Championnat National Statistics

Championnat National seasons
France
3